Synaphea nexosa is a shrub endemic to Western Australia.

The densely tangled shrub typically grows to  that blooms between October and November producing yellow flowers.

It is found on winter wet flats in a small area in the South West region of Western Australia between Augusta and Margaret River where it grows in loamy-clay soils.

References

Eudicots of Western Australia
nexosa
Endemic flora of Western Australia
Plants described in 1995